Sembé is a district in the Sangha Region of north-western Republic of the Congo. The capital lies at Sembé.

Towns and villages

Sangha Department (Republic of the Congo)
Districts of the Republic of the Congo